Leucania uda is a moth of the family Noctuidae. It is found in Australia.

The wingspan is about 20 mm.

References

uda